Breaking the Rules may refer to:
Breaking the Rules (song), a 1983 song by English post-punk band Ludus
Breaking the Rules (film), a 1992 American drama film
"Breaking the Rules", a 1995 song by Michael Learns to Rock from Played on Pepper
"Breaking the Rules", a 1981 song by AC/DC from For Those About to Rock We Salute You